James Allen Shields (1929 - July 16, 1996) was a Canadian curler and race horse owner.

Shields grew up in Sceptre, Saskatchewan, where he was a star baseball player, and was inducted into the Saskatchewan Baseball Hall of Fame. While in Saskatchewan, he attended the University of Saskatchewan. He began curling at the age of 12 and moved to Calgary in the 1950s, where he worked for Sun Oil's land department, and would later start up Nordic Oil. Shields was also an owner of race horses and formed Canada West Ranches with fellow curlers Ron Northcott and Barry Naimark, plus friends Al MacDonald and Eric Bishop. In 1979, Shields won the Sovereign Award for Outstanding Owner. He is a member of the Alberta Sports Hall of Fame.

Shields was married to Joan and had four children, Lorie, Richard, Randy and David. He died of cancer.

Teams

References

External links

 James Shields – Curling Canada Stats Archive

Canadian male curlers
Curlers from Saskatchewan
Curlers from Calgary
World curling champions
Brier champions
Deaths from cancer in Alberta
University of Saskatchewan alumni
Canadian baseball players
Canadian racehorse owners and breeders
Canadian oilmen
1929 births
1996 deaths